87 may refer to: 
 87 (number)
 one of the years 87 BC, AD 87, 1987, 2087, etc.
 Atomic number 87, francium
 Intel 8087, a floating-point coprocessor
 87; Common gasoline rating

See also
 
 List of highways numbered